NS14, NS-14, NS 14, or N.S. 14 may refer to:

Places
 Khatib MRT station (station code: NS14), Yishun, Singapore
 Myōkenguchi Station (station code: NS14), Toyono, Toyono District, Osaka Prefecture, Japan
 Cumberland North (constituency N.S. 14), Nova Scotia, Canada
 Nickerie District (FIPS region code NS14), Suriname

Other uses
 NS14 (dinghy class) (Northbridge Senior 14), Australian sailing dinghy development class
 Blue Origin NS-14, a 2021 January 14 Blue Origin suborbital spaceflight mission for the New Shepard
 RAF N.S. 14, a British NS class airship

See also

 NS (disambiguation)
 14 (disambiguation)